The 1788–89 United States presidential election in South Carolina took place between December 15, 1788 – January 10, 1789 as part of the 1789 United States presidential election. The state legislature chose 7 representatives, or electors to the Electoral College, who voted for President and Vice President.

South Carolina, which had become the 8th state on May 23, 1788, unanimously cast its seven electoral votes for George Washington during its first presidential election.

References

 

South Carolina
United States presidential elections in South Carolina
United States President